Al-Masara (pronounced al-Ma'sara; translation: "the press") is a Palestinian village in the central West Bank, 6.2 km southwest of Bethlehem, part of the Bethlehem Governorate. It is surrounded by a number of smaller Palestinian villages, including Khallet al-Haddad to the east. The population was 803 in the 2007 census by the Palestinian Central Bureau of Statistics (PCBS).

History
Its name, which translates as "the press", derives from the Byzantine Empire-era olive press still located in al-Ma'sara. In 1883  the PEF's Survey of Western Palestine (SWP) noted "heaps of stones and cisterns" at Khurbet Marsia.  

The modern town was founded in 1930 by members of the Arab al-Zawahra and at-Ta'mirah tribes.

Modern era
After the Six-Day War in 1967, Al-Masara  has been under  Israeli occupation. 

A seven-member local development committee was established by the Palestinian National Authority (PNA) to administer the village, most which is located in Area B giving the PNA jurisdiction over al-Ma'sara's civil affairs. The head of the committee is Mahmoud Alaeddin.

There is one mosque, al-Ma'sara Mosque, and a primary and secondary school in the village. Agriculture accounts for 70% of al-Ma'sara's economic activity, while the civil sector makes up 16%. The total land area is 973 dunams, of which 42 dunams are designated built-up. Most of the remainder is arable land, 505 dunams of which are cultivated.

References

Bibliography

 
 (p. 400)

External links
Welcome To Kh. al-Ma'sara
Al Ma'sara Village (Fact Sheet), Applied Research Institute–Jerusalem, ARIJ
Al Ma’sara Village Profile, ARIJ
Al Ma’sara  aerial photo, ARIJ
Survey of Western Palestine, Map 21:    IAA, Wikimedia commons

Populated places established in 1930
Bethlehem Governorate
Villages in the West Bank